Xculoc is a village in Campeche, Mexico.  This settlement of Maya people is located 20 kilometres south of Uxmal and the same distance west of Sayil.

Ancient  Puuc style Mayan building ruins are located in Xculoc.

References

Populated places in Campeche
Maya sites in Campeche
Maya Classic Period